The Great Fires of 1947 were a series of forest fires in the State of Maine in the United States that destroyed a total area of  of wooded land on Mount Desert Island and  statewide. Collectively, the fires killed a total of 16 people. This disaster is an important part of the local history of the York County and Mount Desert Island areas.

The fires
After a wet spring, in which the months of April, May and June were inundated with rainy weather, the climate turned to drought conditions in July, 1947. By the end of September, the ground was extremely dry. State and local officials, recognizing the dangers of the dry conditions, began implementing preventative measures such as informing the public to have their chimneys cleaned. By the second week of October, the state was in a Class 4 state of danger, meaning: "high state of inflammability." The State Forest Service reopened fire watch towers normally closed at the end of September.

Reports of small fires in woods began coming into the Forest Service on October 7. These early fires burned in Portland, Bowdoin and Wells. After this, reports of fires poured in, and by October 16, 20 separate fires were burning in the state. By October 19, many communities in Maine breathed air filled with a smoky haze and the smell of burning wood.

York County
Hardest hit was northern York County, the southernmost county in the state. Fires began in the towns of Shapleigh and Waterboro, destroying both communities, including, with only a few exceptions, most homes. The fires swept through the forests, and moved with the wind toward the ocean. In addition to Waterboro and Shapleigh, the towns of Alfred, Lyman, Newfield, Kennebunk, Kennebunkport, North Kennebunkport (now Arundel), Dayton, Wells, and the cities of Biddeford and Saco were devastated by fire. With the exception of Shapleigh and Waterboro, most town centers were saved through the tireless work of firefighters, most notably Goodwins Mills in the eastern corner of Lyman, where due in part to a change in wind direction, only the center was saved, and all of the acreage around it burned to the ground.

Restoration
After the fire, bulldozers were brought in to clear the debris and standing chimneys where homes once stood. It took a decade for many to fully recover their losses.

Modern evidence of the Great Fires
Even today evidence exists of the Great Fires that swept through York County. In Waterboro, Shapleigh and Lyman, where the devastation was great, forests of small, undesirable pine trees grow en masse where great forests stood before the fires. One would notice on visits to these communities that homes within them lack historical significance; the oldest were built in the late 1940s. Most historic farms and homes built before 1947 in these communities were destroyed.

In the late 1980s, to commemorate the Great Fires of 1947, the State of Maine developed signs for each community where the fires burned, detailing the effect the fires had on those communities. Signs still stand today in many communities, including Alfred at the Alfred Fire Department on Kennebunk road, Shapleigh at the Ross Corner Fire Department on Ross Corner Road, and North Kennebunkport (Arundel) at the Central Fire Station and Town Hall on Limerick Road.

Many people fought to save their homes. In a book published in 1979, Joyce Butler wrote about the Great Fires of 1947 in Wildfire Loose: The Week Maine Burned:

Juanita and Franklin Spofford lived on the Granite Point Road across Horseshoe Cove from Fortunes Rocks. The Spoffords wet down their house with a garden hose until the pressure failed. Then they filled buckets and tubs and set them around the house. As burning debris carried by the wind fell in the grass, setting it afire, they wet brooms in the buckets and beat the flames out. Bushes beside the garage caught fire. The house across the street and others on Granite Point Road burned, but the Spoffords' did as well.

Bibliography
Joyce Butler, Wildfire Loose: The Week Maine Burned (Downeast Books, 1979)

References

Natural disasters in Maine
Wildfires in Maine
1947 in Maine
1947 fires in the United States
York County, Maine
Hancock County, Maine
1940s wildfires in the United States
1947 natural disasters in the United States